Jennifer Smatt (born 13 August 1974) is a Bermudian swimmer. She competed in three events at the 1992 Summer Olympics.

Her family ran a bicycle rental business, Smatt's Cycle Livery.  She has one brother.

Smatt is a licensed advisor for Investors in People.  As of 2021, she is the president of Ontru, a human resources company.

References

External links
 

1974 births
Living people
Bermudian female swimmers
Olympic swimmers of Bermuda
Swimmers at the 1992 Summer Olympics
Place of birth missing (living people)